Kirsten Auke Elisabeth van den Hul (born 18 August 1976 in Deventer) is a Dutch columnist and politician. She was elected to the House of Representatives for the Labour Party during the 2017 general election. Since October, 2022 she serves as Director of DutchCulture,  a Dutch organisation for international cultural cooperation.

References

External links 
 Kirsten van den Hul at the website of the House of Representatives
  Kirsten van den Hul at the website of the Labour Party

1976 births
Labour Party (Netherlands) politicians
Living people
Members of the House of Representatives (Netherlands)
21st-century Dutch politicians
21st-century Dutch women politicians
People from Deventer